Kadaster is the name designation of the Dutch Cadastre, Land Registry and national mapping agency in the Netherlands. The word Kadaster comes from the medieval Latin catastrum, descended from either the Greek καταστιχον (kata acrostic), frame, or the Latin capitatrastum (head), a Roman head tax based on property ownership.

Kadaster is the responsibility of the Ministry of the Interior and Kingdom Relations. The headquarters of the agency is located in Apeldoorn.

See also
Land administration
Property

References

External links
Kadaster

Government agencies of the Netherlands
National mapping agencies
Land registration